Neolimnophila is a genus of crane flies in the family Limoniidae.

Species
N. alticola Alexander, 1929
N. andicola Alexander, 1942
N. appalachicola Alexander, 1941
N. bergrothi (Kuntze, 1919)
N. bifusca Alexander, 1960
N. brevissima Alexander, 1952
N. capnioptera Alexander, 1947
N. carteri (Tonnoir, 1921)
N. citribasis Alexander, 1966
N. daedalea Alexander, 1966
N. fuscinervis Edwards, 1928
N. fuscocubitalis Alexander, 1936
N. genitalis (Brunetti, 1912)
N. perreducta Alexander, 1935
N. picturata Alexander, 1931
N. placida (Meigen, 1830)
N. ultima (Osten Sacken, 1860)

References

Limoniidae
Tipuloidea genera